Lindores Abbey distillery is a Scotch whisky distillery in Newburgh in the Lowlands whisky region in Scotland and is directly opposite the Abbey. It started distilling whisky in December 2017, using three stills made by Forsyths of Rothes. Lindores Abbey planned to produce 150,000 litres of spirit per year.

Scotch whisky must be aged a minimum of three years, in oak barrels, and the Abbey planned to age its products for five years. Hence, no whisky sales would be made until at least 2021. In the meantime, the distillery was selling its aqua vitae, since this type of alcoholic beverage does not require such long aging.

The distillery is located on the Lindores Abbey Farm, which was bought by Drew McKenzie Smith’s grandfather in 1913. The family owns the distillery and Drew McKenzie Smith holds the title of ‘Custodian of Lindores’ since the family is guardian of the grounds of the Abbey. The distillers have set up a Preservation Society whose mission is to preserve the Abbey for future generations.

The barley used here is grown in Fife; since mid-2019, it has been the Concerto strain grown on two farms adjoining the abbey property. By the end of 2019, the distillery planned to use "locally grown Lindores barley exclusively".

References 

Distilleries in Scotland
Scottish malt whisky